Seaborg Technologies is a private Danish startup. It is developing small molten salt reactors.
Founded in 2015 and based in Copenhagen, Denmark, Seaborg emerged as a small team of physicists, chemists, and engineers with educational roots at the Niels Bohr Institute, CERN, ESS (European Spallation Source) and DTU (Technical University of Denmark) who share a common vision of safe, sustainable and cheap nuclear power. Seaborg Technologies is named after the American nuclear chemist and Nobel laureate Glenn T. Seaborg.

Compact Molten Salt Reactor 
The reactor designed by Seaborg Technologies is called the Compact Molten Salt Reactor (CMSR). The company claims that it is inherently safe, significantly smaller, better for the environment, and inexpensive even compared to fossil fuel-based electricity.

Conventional nuclear reactors have solid fuel rods that need constant cooling, typically using water under high pressure. Water is abundantly available but its low boiling point is  a vulnerability creating a potential point of failure. In contrast, in a CMSR, fuel is mixed in a liquid salt whose boiling point is far above the temperatures produced by the fission products. This enables it to operate stably at a pressure of one atmosphere.

Unlike other thermal spectrum molten salt reactors the CMSR does not use graphite as a moderator. Instead it used molten Sodium hydroxide (NaOH) contained in pipes adjacent to and interlaced with pipes that contain the molten fuel salt. This enables a more compact design. It also allows the liquid moderator to be rapidly removed from the core as a fission control mechanism.

In the case of an overheating accident, a frozen salt plug at the base of the reactor melts and the liquid fuel flows out of the reactor core away from the moderator into cooled tanks where the reaction quenches, the fuel cools and solidifies, without dispersing in the surrounding environment.

The approach mitigates the danger of a failure rather than eliminating all failures.

Deployment 
The company intends to deploy its shipping container sized reactors on barges. Reactors are manufactured at scale in a central facility, reducing costs. Using barges makes them mobile. Single reactor output is estimated to be 200 MWe. Multiple units could be deployed on a single barge.

The primary design challenge is in preventing the highly corrosive fuel slurry and moderator from damaging the reactor.

The fueling cycle is 12 years. It offers no proliferation risk or military applications.

A prototype is scheduled for 2025, and Seaborg Technologies hopes to have regulatory approval in 2026 and to be ready for deployment in 2027.

References 

Nuclear reactors
Technology companies based in Copenhagen
Danish companies established in 2015
Companies based in Copenhagen Municipality